Samantha Reeves and Jessica Steck were the defending champions, but Steck decided not to participate this year. Reeves partnered with Nana Miyagi, but lost in the semifinals to Els Callens and Meilen Tu.

Li Ting and Sun Tiantian won the title, defeating Callens and Tu 6–3, 6–3 in the final.

Seeds

Draw

References
Main Draw

Challenge Bell
Tournoi de Québec
Can